Phnum Sampov is a khum (commune) of Banan District in Battambang Province in north-western Cambodia.

Villages
Phnum Sampov contains ten villages.

References

Communes of Battambang province
Banan District, Battambang Province